1 Kings 3 is the third chapter of the Books of Kings in the Hebrew Bible or the First Book of Kings in the Old Testament of the Christian Bible. The book is a compilation of various annals recording the acts of the kings of Israel and Judah by a Deuteronomic compiler in the seventh century BCE, with a supplement added in the sixth century BCE. This chapter belongs to the section focusing on the reign of Solomon over the unified kingdom of Judah and Israel (1 Kings 1 to 11). The focus of this chapter is the reign of Solomon, the king of Israel.

Text
This chapter was originally written in the Hebrew language and since the 16th century is divided into 28 verses.

Textual witnesses
Some early manuscripts containing the text of this chapter in Hebrew are of the Masoretic Text tradition, which includes the Codex Cairensis (895), Aleppo Codex (10th century), and Codex Leningradensis (1008). Fragments containing parts of this chapter in Hebrew were found among the Dead Sea Scrolls, that is, 6Q4 (6QpapKgs; 150–75 BCE) with extant verses 12–14.

There is also a translation into Koine Greek known as the Septuagint, made in the last few centuries BCE. Extant ancient manuscripts of the Septuagint version include Codex Vaticanus (B; B; 4th century) and Codex Alexandrinus (A; A; 5th century).

Old Testament references
: ; ;

Analysis
This chapter contains one of the important 'biblical treatments' of wisdom in the practical (or,  in this case, also political) context. The first part is dominated with Solomon's request for wisdom, whereas the last part is the demonstration of the wisdom he received from God. The story of Solomon's judgment is similar in certain aspects to the events in 1 Kings 1–2 as in the table below:

Solomon's prayer for wisdom (3:1–15)
Early in his reign, Solomon entered a diplomatic marriage with the Egyptian Pharaoh's daughter which played a significant role in the story of Solomon (cf. 1 Kings 7:8; 9:16; 11:1), although Solomon's heir (Rehoboam) was not born from her, but from Solomon's Ammonite wife (1 Kings 14:21). Solomon received a good mark in the early religious assessment, noted that "he loved YHWH" (just as YHWH loved him, 2 Samuel 12:24). One negative note was that there were 'high places' – sacrificial sites in top of hills, but this happened because Solomon had not yet built the Temple in Jerusalem, which should later be the only place of worship according to the Torah of Moses (Deuteronomy 12). In the Hebrew Bible (and also in the New Testament) dreams are a legitimate method of discovering God's will (cf. Genesis 28; 37; 1 Samuel 28:6, 15; Joel 3:1; Daniel 2; Matthew 2:13), although it could also open to abuse (cf. Jeremiah 23:25–27; Zechariah 10:2, cf. Psalms 73:20).

Verse 1
And Solomon made affinity with Pharaoh king of Egypt, and took Pharaoh's daughter, and brought her into the city of David, until he had made an end of building his own house, and the house of the Lord, and the wall of Jerusalem round about.
"Made affinity": here is not "made "alliance", but literally, "made himself son-in-law".
"Pharaoh king of Egypt": For the first time since the Exodus, Israel had any connection with Egypt. Pharaoh Shishak received Jeroboam when he fled from Solomon (1 Kings 11:40), so the wife of Solomon must have been a daughter of a pharaoh in the previous dynasty. This daughter of Pharaoh apparently embraced Judaism, so that there was no reproach against her marriage to Solomon, since no Egyptian deity was mentioned among those for whom Solomon built high places at a later time (1 Kings 11:1-8) when 'strange women turned away his heart after other gods'.

Solomon's judgement (3:16–28)

This section records one episode of Solomon putting to effect the wisdom granted to him in giving an 'unusually clever court judgement' when he was confronted with a seemingly insoluble problem: 'claim against counter-claim without witnesses or evidence'.  It was the maternal love– in itself not a legally relevant factor– that supplied 'the key to truth and justice'. The wisdom of Solomon in the administration of justice is an important royal function (cf. 2 Samuel 8:15; 15:2–6).

See also

Related Bible parts: 2 Chronicles 1, Psalm 5, Psalm 45, Psalm 72

Notes

References

Sources

External links
 Jewish translations:
 Melachim I - I Kings - Chapter 3 (Judaica Press). Hebrew text and English translation [with Rashi's commentary] at Chabad.org
 Christian translations:
 Online Bible at GospelHall.org (ESV, KJV, Darby, American Standard Version, Bible in Basic English)
 1 Kings chapter 3. Bible Gateway

03